Lagerstroemia minuticarpa is a species of plant in the family Lythraceae. It is endemic to India.

References

minuticarpa
Flora of Assam (region)
Flora of Sikkim
Endangered flora of Asia
Taxonomy articles created by Polbot